What Can I Do? may refer to:

 "What Can I Do?" (Édith Piaf song), 1950
 "What Can I Do" by Smokie from Midnight Café, 1976
 "What Can I Do?" (Ice Cube song), 1994
 "What Can I Do?" (The Corrs song), 1998
 "What Can I Do" (The Black Belles song), 2010
 "What Can I Do" by Gotthard from Human Zoo, 2003